Despite only having won 3 of the 25 seats in 2013 and 2017, Leon Sebbelin from Danish Social Liberal Party had been mayor of Rebild since 2014. Rebild was a part of the '10 bigggest thrillers for the 2021 Danish Local Election', according to Danish news station TV 2. Danish political analyst Hans Redder pointed out before the election, that the constitution for who would become mayor could become untraditional, as seen in 2017, when Danish People's Party, who are seen as a big contrast to the Danish Social Liberal Party, still supported Leon Sebbelin becoming mayor.
The final election result, would see Conservatives enjoying the biggest improvent, with 22% of the vote, compared to the 13% they had received in 2017. Both Venstre and Danish Social Liberal Party lost a seat. However, the day following the election, a constitution was announced, that would see Jesper Greth, from Venstre, becoming mayor.

Electoral system
For elections to Danish municipalities, a number varying from 9 to 31 are chosen to be elected to the municipal council. The seats are then allocated using the D'Hondt method and a closed list proportional representation.
Rebild Municipality had 25 seats in 2021

Unlike in Danish General Elections, in elections to municipal councils, electoral alliances are allowed.

Electoral alliances  

Electoral Alliance 1

Electoral Alliance 2

Electoral Alliance 3

Results

Notes

References 

Rebild